The 2004–05 Japan Figure Skating Championships was the 73rd edition of the event. They were held from December 24 through 26, 2004 at the Shinyokohama Stake Center in Yokohama, Kanagawa Prefecture. Skaters competed on the senior level in the disciplines of men's singles, ladies' singles, pair skating, and ice dancing. The competition was used to decide Japan's entries to the 2005 World Championships and the 2005 Four Continents Championships. The entries to the 2005 World Junior Championships were decided at the Japanese Junior Championships.

Competition notes
 The following skaters placed high enough at Junior Nationals and so were invited to compete at Nationals: Nobunari Oda (first in junior, third in senior), Kazumi Kishimoto (second in junior, fifth in senior), Yasuharu Nanri (third in junior, eighth in senior), and Takahiko Kozuka (fourth in junior, fourth in senior) in men, and Mao Asada (first in junior, second in senior), Mai Asada (second in junior, eighth in senior), Aki Sawada (third in junior, fourth in senior), and Akiko Kitamura (fourth in junior, fifth in senior) in ladies.
 Silver medalist Mao Asada was not old enough to be sent to the World or the Four Continents Championships.

Results

Men

Ladies

Pairs

Ice dancing

Japan Junior Figure Skating Championships
The 2004–05 Japan Junior Figure Skating Championships took place between November 20 and 21, 2004 at the Osaka Pool arena in Osaka.

Men

Ladies

Ice dancing

International team selections

World Championships
Following the national championships, Honda, Arakawa, and Ando were assigned to the World team. All other places were filled following the 2005 Four Continents Championships, with the highest placing Japanese skater earning the available Worlds spot.

Four Continents Championships

External links
 2004–05 Japan Figure Skating Championships results 
 2004–05 Japan Junior Figure Skating Championships results 

Japan Figure Skating Championships
2004 in figure skating
2005 in figure skating
2004 in Japanese sport